Il Primo Libro delle Canzoni is a collection of instrumental Baroque canzonas by the Ferrarese organist and composer Girolamo Frescobaldi. It was published in two different editions in Rome in 1628, and re-issued with substantial revisions in Venice in 1634. The three editions of the Primo Libro contain a total of forty-eight canzonas for one, two, three or four instrumental voices in various combinations, all with basso continuo; as a result of revisions, sixteen of the canzonas exist in two substantially different versions.

Background 

Frescobaldi published intensively in the late 1620s. His Capricci for organ were re-published in 1626, his second book of Toccate for keyboard and his Liber secundus of motets appeared in 1627, the two editions of the Primo Libro in 1628, and the Arie musicali in 1630. The Rome and Venice editions of the Primo Libro date from the beginning and the end of his time at the court of Ferdinando II de' Medici, Grand Duke of Tuscany. The Fiori musicali of 1635 were published soon after the Venice edition of the canzonas.

Rome editions 

The Primo Libro was published in Rome in 1628 in two editions: in five partbooks by Giovan Battista Robletti, and in score by Paolo Masotti. It is not known which of the editions came first: they may have been prepared simultaneously. Unlike a number of earlier publications with score and parts, the two were not prepared together.

The two 1628 editions appear to have been intended for quite different purposes: Ferdinando II de' Medici, Grand Duke of Tuscany, visited Rome in March of that year, and the Robletti partbooks are dedicated to him, apparently with the aim of securing his patronage. Frescobaldi took up a position as a musician to the Florentine court at the end of 1628 and stayed there until April 1634.

The Masotti edition was prepared by Frescobaldi's Luccan pupil Bartolomeo Grassi, and was printed in score so that it could also be played on keyboard instruments. Like the other editions of the Primo Libro, it is set in movable type. The print is accurate and of particularly high quality; unusual for the period, close attention has been paid to the vertical alignment of the notes. Grassi gave each of the thirty-seven canzonas a dedicatory name; as he explains in his postface to the score, these were the names of his friends and patrons, particularly the gentlemen of Lucca. The first piece in the book, Canzon Prima detta la Bonvisia, is named for Girolamo Bonvisi, cleric, who is also the dedicatee of the whole edition. Canzona 18 is dedicated to Masotti.

The content of the two editions is similar, but not identical; the Masotti score contains forty pieces, the Robletti partbooks thirty-five. The Robletti edition contains one piece, Canzon seconda, violino over cornetto, not included in the Masotti print, but omits three of the pieces in that edition, the Canzon Prima, detta la Bonvisia, the Canzona 34, detta la Sandoninia and the Canzona 37, detta la Sardina. Grassi also included two pieces for spinet and one for spinet and violin which are not found in the other editions.

Venice edition 

The edition published in Venice by Alessandro Vincenti in 1634 is substantially different from both the Rome prints. Although dated 1634, it may have been published in 1635 or early in 1636. It consists of thirty canzonas from the Rome editions, of which twenty-eight are in both, and two in the Masotti score only, with the addition of ten new works. Eight canzonas from the 1628 editions are omitted. Of the works from 1628, none was reprinted without some change; in about half of those thirty pieces the changes are relatively minor, while others were substantially rewritten. Of the total of forty-eight canzonas in the collection, sixteen are found in two versions with substantial differences between them.

Catalogue numbers 

The fifty-one pieces in the collection are catalogued as follows:

Notes

References

1628 in music
1628 books
1628 in Italy
Baroque compositions